The women's quadruple sculls competition at the 1984 Summer Olympics took place at took place at Lake Casitas, California, United States of America.

Competition format

The competition consisted of two main rounds (heats and finals) as well as a repechage. The 7 boats were divided into two heats for the first round, with 4 boats in one heat and 3 in the other. The winner of each heat advanced directly to the "A" final (1st through 6th place). The remaining 5 boats were placed in the repechage. A single heat was held in the repechage. The top four boats in the repechage went to the "A" final. The remaining boat (5th place in the repechage) was eliminated at 7th place overall.

All races were over a 1000-metre course. This was the last Games that the women's quadruple sculls used a coxswain.

Results

Heats

The heats were held on July 30, during calm winds on a warm day (27 °C). The winner of each advanced to the A final, with all others going to the repechage. No boats were eliminated in this round.

Heat 1

The Romanian boat established a 2.5 second lead over the West Germans by the halfway mark and won easily. The French team moved past the Germans into second place over the second half, with the Canadians also (by only .02 seconds) overtaking West Germany.

Heat 2

The second heat resulted in an extremely close finish. The American boat had a half-second lead over the Danes at the halfway mark, but the Danish team closed the distance over the last 500 metres. The final margin for the United States was .01 seconds, allowing them to skip the repechage and go straight to the final while Denmark was forced to race in the repechage. Italy was not competitive in this race, finishing 8 seconds after the other two boats.

Repechage

The repechage was held on August 1. The winds were calm, though the day was cooler than during the heats (16 °C). Of the five boats in the repechage, all but one would advance to the final—only the last place boat would be eliminated (taking 7th place).

The West Germany boat started strong, holding nearly a full second lead at the halfway mark. Denmark, France, Italy, and Canada were roughly evenly spaced after that, with approximately half a second between each of those boats. Over the second half of the course, Denmark proved the best—passing West Germany to win by nearly 2 seconds. Canada was unable to gain ground on 4th-place Italy, and finished as the only boat not to reach the final.

Final

Unlike most other rowing events, the women's quadruple sculls had only a single final (with 7 boats in the event, a "B" final would have consisted of only a single team). The final was held on August 4, a cool (18 °C) day with no wind. West Germany again started strong, taking a lead of 1.2 seconds by the halfway mark, before falling back. Romania ultimately won relatively comfortably, beating the silver medalists by a second and a half. The description of the battle for second place in Sports-Reference indicates a very close finish ("the United States and Denmark battled to the line for silver, with the former coming out ahead by another hair's breadth: 0.05 seconds"), though this is not supported by the official times, which have the Americans winning by 0.45 seconds—a close race, but not nearly so close as the two had in the heats.

The third through sixth place teams finished in the same order as they had in the repechage, with Denmark taking the bronze followed by West Germany, France, and Italy.

Final classification

References

Rowing at the 1984 Summer Olympics
Women's rowing at the 1984 Summer Olympics